The Pier 43 Ferry Arch is an historic ferry arch at Pier 43 in San Francisco's Fisherman's Wharf, in the U.S. state of California. Its headhouse, a decorated hoisting tower for loading and unloading rail cars on and off ferries, was built in 1914 to serve the Belt Railroad. The wood pier was replaced in 1996. The headhouse was rehabilitated in 2002–2003 to the Secretary of the Interior's Standards after a fire in 1998.

References

1915 establishments in California
Buildings and structures completed in 1915
Fisherman's Wharf, San Francisco